San de Fuca is an unincorporated community and geographical location on Whidbey Island in Island County, Washington, United States.  Formerly a small town in the 19th century, it lies on the north side of Penn Cove across from Coupeville.

References

Unincorporated communities in Island County, Washington
Unincorporated communities in Washington (state)